First Come, First Served is the third solo studio album by American recording artist Kool Keith, and the first he released under the alias Dr. Dooom. It was released on May 4, 1999 by Funky Ass Records. The album featured guest appearances from Jacky Jasper and Motion Man, and was produced entirely by KutMasta Kurt and Kool Keith. It peaked at number 48 on the Heatseekers Albums.

Music

Production 
Production duties from the album were handled by KutMasta Kurt. According to Allmusic critic Steve Huey, the musical style of the album was an attempt to replicate the production style of Dr. Octagonecologyst.

Lyrical themes and storyline 
The album's concept involves a serial killer named Dr. Dooom, who has a fondness for "cannibalism, pet rats, and Flintstones vitamins". The album opens with Dr. Dooom murdering Dr. Octagon. According to Steve Huey, this "[signals] Keith's desire to move away from the alternative audience who embraced that album and back to his roots in street-level hip-hop". The lyrical content is darker and more violent than that of Dr. Octagonecologyst. Huey states that the album's lyrics are "way too far out to fulfill Keith's aspirations; he simply doesn't fit into hip-hop's obsession with realism." The album's cover art was designed by Pen & Pixel Graphics as a parody of the covers they had previously created for No Limit Records releases, such as Silkk the Shocker's Charge It 2 Da Game.

Reception 

Critical response was positive. Robert Christgau wrote that "No rapper has ever imagined such disgusting apartments—lurid locales with fluorescent cereal on the floor. More than all the 'body parts in shopping carts,' it's the decor that puts the 'fake gangsta hardcore stories' Dooom despises to shame." Allmusic reviewer Steve Huey wrote that "The second half loses a bit of focus as it gets away from the concept, but overall it's pretty consistent".

In 2008, a follow-up, Dr. Dooom 2, was produced in response to The Return of Dr. Octagon.

Track listing 

Notes
Track 20 includes a hidden track, "Bald Headed Girl", which begins at 5:10 after a short period of silence.

Personnel 
 Keith Matthew Thornton – vocals, producer, executive producer
 Sean Merrick – vocals (tracks: 5, 12) 
 Paul K. Laster – vocals (track 8)
 Kurt Matlin – producer, engineering, mixing
 Eddy Schreyer – mastering
 Gene Grimaldi – mastering
 Kenny Salcido – additional engineering
 Pen & Pixel – artwork and design

References

External links

1999 albums
Kool Keith albums
Horrorcore albums